Little Tonshi Mountain is a mountain located in the Catskill Mountains of New York southeast of Phoenicia. Beetree Hill is located north, and Tonshi Mountain is located east-northeast of Little Tonshi Mountain.

References

Mountains of Ulster County, New York
Mountains of New York (state)